The 2003 BMW Open tennis tournament was played in Munich, Germany as part of the International Series of the 2003 ATP Tour. The tournament ran from April 28 through May 4, 2003.

Petr Luxa and Radek Štěpánek were the defending doubles champions, but lost in the first round to Tomáš Cibulec and Pavel Vízner.

Wayne Black and Kevin Ullyett won in the final 6–3, 7–5 against Joshua Eagle and Jared Palmer.

Seeds

  Wayne Black /  Kevin Ullyett (champions)
  Joshua Eagle /  Jared Palmer (final)
  Tomáš Cibulec /  Pavel Vízner (semifinals)
  Yevgeny Kafelnikov /  David Prinosil (quarterfinals)

Draw

External links
 2003 BMW Open Doubles Draw

2003 ATP Tour
2003 BMW Open